A partial solar eclipse occurred on January 21, 1852 during summer. A solar eclipse occurs when the Moon passes between Earth and the Sun, thereby totally or partly obscuring the image of the Sun for a viewer on Earth. A partial solar eclipse occurs in the polar regions of the Earth when the center of the Moon's shadow misses the Earth.

It was first of three partial eclipses that took place that year within the space of nearly six months, the last one was in June 1852 in the same hemisphere with a very tiny portion in the same area with the previous eclipse but the remainder in South America. It was the twelfth solar saros 148 cycle of eclipses

Description
The eclipse was visible in almost the whole of Antarctica which had a 24-hour daylight with the exception of one part of the mid northernmost area of Antarctica by the Indian Ocean and around the area of the Antarctic Circle, a small piece of southernmost Tasmania with Hobart in it, most all of New Zealand's South Island and a small part of Wellington on North Island, the nearby Antipodes, Chatham Islands and Macquarrie Island.  It also included the southernmost areas of the Atlantic, Indian and Pacific Oceans.

The eclipse started at sunrise around the area of the South Orkney Islands and finished at sunset in New Zealand.

The eclipse showed up to 45% obscuration in the area of the greatest eclipse which occurred at sunset.

in Tasmania and southeastern Australia and finished at sunset at the Pacific and a tiny part of Western Antarctica. The greatest eclipse was in the Pacific Ocean hundreds of miles (or kilometers) north of Antarctica at 68.9 S & 124.3 E at 7:12 UTC (11:12 AM local time on January 20).

The subsolar marking was in the Indian Ocean around the Tropic of Capricorn and offshore from the Agalega Islands.

See also 
 List of solar eclipses in the 19th century
 List of solar eclipses visible from Australia

References

External links 
 Google interactive maps
 Solar eclipse data

1852 01 21
Solar eclipse of 01 21
1852 in New Zealand
1852 01 21
January 1852 events